Dimitrie Brândză (1846–1895) was a Romanian botanist. He founded the Botanical Garden of Bucharest, which is now named in his honor.

Brândză was born in Viișoara, Botoșani County. After studying at the Academia Mihăileană in Iași, he earned a Ph.D. from the University of Paris in 1869. He was a professor at the University of Iași and the University of Bucharest. In 1879 he was elected titular member of the Romanian Academy.

He died in Slănic-Moldova and was buried at Bellu Cemetery, in Bucharest.

Taxa named in honour
There are number of plants with specific name brandzae. Including; Iris brandzae, Agropyron brandzae Pantu & Solacolu. and Verbascum glabratum subsp. brandzae.

Also a mussel in the Unionidae family is named, Potomida brandzae (Sabba S. Ștefănescu, 1896).

References

External links
 "Short biography"

Romanian botanists
Botanists active in Europe
Romanian biologists
brând
Academic staff of the University of Bucharest
Academic staff of Alexandru Ioan Cuza University
Burials at Bellu Cemetery
1846 births
1895 deaths
People from Botoșani County
University of Paris alumni
Romanian expatriates in France